Khok Salud is a subdistrict (tambon) in the Bang Krathum District of Phitsanulok Province, Thailand.

Geography
Khok Salut is bounded to the north by Ban Rai, to the east by Bang Krathum, to the south by Sanam Khli, and to the west by Phichit Province. Most of Khok Salut lies in the Nan Basin, although a narrow strip of land on the west side of the subdistrict lies in the Yom Basin.  Both basins are part of the Chao Phraya Watershed. The Nan River flows through Khok Salut.

Administration
The subdistrict is divided into 10 smaller divisions called (mubans), which roughly correspond to the villages in Khok Salut. There are six villages, several of which occupy multiple mubans. Khok Salut is administered by a tambon administrative organization (TAO). The mubans in Khok Salut are enumerated as follows:

Temples
Khok Salut is home to the following four temples:
วัดราษฎร์เจริญ in Ban Chong Glang
Wat Kam Paeng Manee (Thai: วัดกำแพงมณี) in Ban Chong Tai
Wat Prasat Satta (Thai: วัดประสาทศรัทธา, 'Temple of Bestowed Faith')  in Ban Yan Yao
Wat Yan Yao (Thai: วัดย่านยาว, 'Temple of Vast Expanse') in Ban Yan Yao

References

Tambon of Phitsanulok province
Populated places in Phitsanulok province